Ondalla Eradalla is a 2018 Indian comedy drama film written and directed by D. Satya Prakash who previously wrote and directed Rama Rama Re, and produced by Umapathy Srinivas who has also produced Hebbuli. Production of the film started in February, the lead actor Rohith Pandavpura a young boy from Pandavapura was selected out of the 1500 kids auditioned for the film.

Plot 
The story revolves around a seven year old boy named Sameera who loses his pet Banu. He goes alone in search of his pet cow to a town called 'Pete', along the way he meets many people from different sections of society. Innocence is the main theme of the movie, whether his innocence can reign over the selfishness of the people he meets on the way to recover his lost pet forms the main crux of the movie.

Cast 

 Rohith Pandavpura as Sameer
 Sai Krishna Kudla as Huli
 M. K. Mutt
 Anand Neenasam as Nandagopala, a financier 
 Prabhudeva Hosadurga as Rajanna
 Nagabhushana as Suresha, an auto rickshaw driver
 Ramzaan Saab Ullaagaddi
 G. S. Ranganath
 U. V. Nanjappa Benaka
 Thimappa Kulal
 Sandhya Arakere
 Usha Ravishankar
 Triveni M. Vasishta

Music 
Music for the film was composed by Vasuki Vaibhav and Nobin Paul and was released on 25 July 2018 on YouTube. Lyrics for the tracks were written by D. Satya Prakash for the soundtrack.

Awards and nominations

References 

2010s Kannada-language films
Indian comedy-drama films
Best Film on National Integration National Film Award winners
Films set in Karnataka
Indian children's films
Child characters in film